The Massachusetts Children's Book Award is an annual literary award recognizing one book selected by vote of Massachusetts schoolchildren from a list prepared by committee. It was established in 1975 by Dr. Helen Constant, associate professor of education at Salem State College, and it continues to be sponsored by the School of Education at Salem State University. The purpose is to help maintain interest in reading among children in the "intermediate grades". 

Students in grades 4 to 6 (almost all 9 to 12 years old) are eligible to vote for one favorite book if they have read at least five on the list, which now comprises 25 books that are no more than five years old. Participation is coordinated through schools, often by the school library, but public librarians may facilitate the program for home-schooled children and those whose schools do not participate in the program.  The book with the greatest number of votes wins the Award—the writer gets a commemorative plaque—and a number of runners-up, commonly four, are named honor books. 

Currently "teachers, librarians, and interested publishers" nominate books and all of those selected must be available in paperback editions. Other criteria include "literary quality, variety of genres, representation of diverse cultural groups, and reader appeal." For the 2014 award, the Master List comprised 25 books published from 2009 to 2013, almost half in 2011. A "Grade Level Guide" placed five of the books in each of five levels from "low fourth" (low fourth grade) to "advanced sixth".

History 

The Mass. Children's Book Award program was inaugurated during the 1975–76 school year and the first winner was How to Eat Fried Worms by Thomas Rockwell, which was then three years old. The "First Annual Massachusetts Book Award Conference" was scheduled to run for seven hours from 8:30 at Salem State College Library on July 1. It was one of the "Specials", distinct from "Bicentennial" events, listed by The Boston Globe that morning. One year later Tales of a Fourth Grade Nothing by Judy Blume won the second poll, in which 5000 students in 400 classes voted on 25 books "nominated by teachers, librarians, and youngsters". Second to fifth-place finishers were also identified at the mid-year conference. Late that year the Globe reported that "children in grades 4 through 9 will vote for their favorite books in the third annual contest". For six years then, to 1983, there were a pair of MCBA determined by votes of children in grades 4–6 and in grades 7–9 (generally, ages 9–12 and 12–15). The grades 7–9 winner in 1979, The Cat Ate My Gymsuit by Paula Danziger, had been the runner-up in 1977, voted by grades 4–6 only.

Tales of a Fourth Grade Nothing won the grades 4–6 award again in 1983, the only book to win two MCBA. Four books published during the 1950s and 1960s were winners, as late as 1987 (see table). After 1995, however, the Master List was limited to books published during the five-year span ending that year (that is, 1992 to 1996 for the 1997 award). The winning books since then have ranged from one to five years old.

Massachusetts Children's Book Award Nominees
2017 MCBA Nominees

Winners

Multiple awards 

Louis Sachar has written three MCBA-winning books, published from 1987 to 1998: There's a Boy in the Girls' Bathroom, Wayside School Gets A Little Stranger, and Holes. Several people have written two winning books and Tales of a Fourth Grade Nothing (Dutton, 1972) by Judy Blume won both the 1977 and 1983 awards.

References

External links

 MCBA winners at Goodreads 

American children's literary awards
Awards established in 1975
Massachusetts culture
Massachusetts education-related lists